Hartman Creek State Park is a  Wisconsin state park near Waupaca, Wisconsin, United States. The park contains several small lakes. The Ice Age National Scenic Trail passes through the park.

References

External links
Hartman Creek State Park Wisconsin Department of Natural Resources
Friends of Hartman Creek State Park

State parks of Wisconsin
Protected areas of Portage County, Wisconsin
Protected areas of Waupaca County, Wisconsin
Protected areas established in 1966
1966 establishments in Wisconsin